You is the second studio album by Kate Havnevik. It was self-released October 10, 2011 on Continentica Records. In order to fund the recording of the album, Havnevik used the crowdsourcing website PledgeMusic, raising 247% of her original goal.

Track listing

References

2011 albums
Kate Havnevik albums
Albums produced by Guy Sigsworth